The Gambian slit-faced bat (Nycteris gambiensis) is a species of bat in the family Nycteridae found in Benin, Burkina Faso, Cameroon, Ivory Coast, Gambia, Ghana, Guinea, Guinea-Bissau, Mali, Mauritania, Niger, Nigeria, Senegal, Sierra Leone, and Togo. Its natural habitats are subtropical or tropical moist lowland forest and savanna.

References

Nycteridae
Mammals described in 1912
Taxa named by Knud Andersen
Bats of Africa
Taxonomy articles created by Polbot